Synalamis is a genus of moths of the family Erebidae. The genus was erected by Paul Dognin in 1912.

Species
Synalamis abaris (Herrich-Schäffer, [1869]) Venezuela
Synalamis amplificata (Felder & Rogenhofer, 1874) Brazil (Amazonas)
Synalamis brunneoviridans Dognin, 1921 Colombia
Synalamis cometas (Dognin, 1914) Colombia
Synalamis expallida (Dognin, 1914) Ecuador
Synalamis grisescens (Dognin, 1914) Peru
Synalamis indistincta (Dognin, 1914) Ecuador
Synalamis micropis (Hampson, 1926) Argentina (Mendoza)
Synalamis polioides (Guenée, 1852) Chile
Synalamis rufescens (Hampson, 1926) Argentina (Tucuman)
Synalamis tremula (Schaus, 1901) Venezuela

References

Calpinae